Osman Arslan (born December 21, 1942, in Kalecik, Ankara) is a high ranked Turkish judge and currently the First President of the Court of Cassation of Turkey.

External links
  Osman Arslan at the official High Court of Appeals website

1942 births
Living people
Court of Cassation (Turkey) justices
People from Ankara
Turkish civil servants